The Living Infinite is the ninth studio album by Swedish melodic death metal band Soilwork, released on 27 February 2013 in Asia, 1 March 2013 in Europe, on 4 March 2013 in the UK and on 5 March 2013 in the US. It is the band's first double album. It is also the first Soilwork release to feature guitarist David Andersson; founding guitarist Peter Wichers left Soilwork for the second time in 2012, making this the second album to not feature him. This also marks the band's last album with longtime bassist Ola Flink who parted ways with the band right before the recording of the next album The Ride Majestic.

Reception

Critical reception 

The album received high acclaim. Trey Spencer of Sputnikmusic gave the album a "Superb" rating of 4.3/5, praising the album's heavier sound, dynamic songwriting and melodic, progressive content. Calling it Soilwork's "strongest, most consistent album to date", he stated that the band "have simultaneously stepped back to their past while maintaining their current sound, but they have also diversified their formula more than ever before – and they did so without a single filler track." However, writing for Decibel Magazine, Adrien Begrand stated that "the primary flaw of The Living Infinite is its lack of variety, the cookie-cutter nature of the songwriting wearing thin after the halfway point".

Commercial performance
In the United States, the album debuted at No. 60 on the Billboard 200, and No. 20 on the Top Rock Albums, selling 7,800 copies in its first week.  The album has sold 26,000 copies in the US as of August 2015.

Track listing

Credits 
Writing, performance and production credits are adapted from the album liner notes.

Personnel 
Soilwork
 Björn Strid – vocals
 Sylvain Coudret – guitars
 David Andersson – guitars
 Ola Flink – bass
 Sven Karlsson – keyboards
 Dirk Verbeuren – drums

Guest musicians
 Justin Sullivan – vocals on "The Windswept Mercy"

Additional musicians
 Hanna Carlsson – cello on "Spectrum of Eternity", "The Living Infinite II"; piano on "Spectrum of Eternity"

Production
 Soilwork – production
 Jens Bogren – production, mixing, mastering
 Johan Örnborg – production assistance
 Linus Corneliusson – production assistance

Artwork and design
 Mircea Gabriel Eftemie (Mnemic) – album cover
 Hannah Verbeuren – photography

Studios 
 Fascination Street – mixing, mastering

Charts

References

External links 
 
 The Living Infinite at Nuclear Blast

2013 albums
Nuclear Blast albums
Soilwork albums
Albums produced by Jens Bogren